La Marseillaise is an office skyscraper in the Euroméditerranée, Marseille, France. It is part of Les Quais d'Arenc development complex and located near the CMA CGM Tower, the city's tallest building. The building construction started in 2015 and finished in 2018. It was developed by Constructa Urban Systems and designed by Ateliers Jean Nouvel. It is known for its innovative tricolor facade design and ranked second in 2018 Emporis Skyscraper Award.

Design
The building was designed to capture the reflection of the city's waterfront area. Its facade was painted in 27 different shades of red, white, and blue to represent the color of the sky, cloud, and the surrounding neighbourhoods. The tower also used light and fiber concrete as its structural material to give an impression of an unfinished work.

See also
 List of tallest buildings in France

References

Office buildings completed in 2018
Buildings and structures in Marseille
Office buildings
La Marseillaise
21st-century architecture in France